"When the Swallows Fly" is a song by the Bee Gees released on their fifth album Idea.  Its promotional video was filmed in Brussels and included on the TV special Idea and was aired on 11 December 1968.

Background
The song's opening line echoed William Wordsworth's poem"I Wandered Lonely as a Cloud". It was recorded on June 18th 1968 at the same session as "No Name". Robin said "It was one of my favorites, I think Barry's vocal on that is fantastic". Barry recalls: "['When the Swallows Fly'] that's something I brought in, but I don't remember how the song came about. It was probably written in Eaton Square or at the penthouse. A lot of the ballads in those days were written that way, like 'Words'.

Chart performance
In 1971, when it was included on the Melody film soundtrack, it was released as a single only in Netherlands with "Give Your Best" as the B-side. It reached #20 in two weeks

Weekly charts

Personnel
 Barry Gibb — lead vocals, guitar
 Maurice Gibb — bass, piano, organ, mellotron, backing vocals
 Colin Petersen — drums
 Robin Gibb — backing vocals
 Vince Melouney — acoustic guitar

References

Bee Gees songs
Songs written by Barry Gibb
Songs written by Robin Gibb
Songs written by Maurice Gibb
Song recordings produced by Robert Stigwood
Song recordings produced by Barry Gibb
Song recordings produced by Robin Gibb
Song recordings produced by Maurice Gibb
1968 songs
1971 singles
Polydor Records singles
Rock ballads